Ammopelmatus kelsoensis, commonly known as the Kelso Jerusalem cricket,  is a species of insect in the family Stenopelmatidae. It is endemic to the Kelso Dunes in the United States.  Despite intensive collecting, all  specimens have only been found at Point Conception.

Description
Jerusalem crickets are large, striking orthopteran insects.  The genus Ammopelmatus differs from other genera of stenopelmatine crickets in the following characters: 
Having vestigial or absent tibial spines on the apical dorsal margins of the caudal tibiae
Median or presubapical spur on the ventral surface of the foretibiae absent

Diagnostic Characteristics
Leg characters, such as the form of spines and spurs, are important for differentiating species in this genus.  Ammopelmatus kelsoensis has short, spatulate apical tibial spurs and calcars.  The fore tibia has only two small ventral spines, and the hind tibia has only one ventral one.  Ammopelmatus muwu can be distinguished 
from A. kelsoensis by the curved apical spur on the internal margin of the fore tibia, 
the hind tibia with the first tooth on the internal margin, and first major tooth on the 
external margin of the hind tibia short and blunt.  John and Rentz (1987) studied the 
chromosomes of this species.

Behavior and Ecology
All three known specimens were collected in a burrow of a Rhachocnemis spider colony. One specimen was feeding on a small Rhacocnemis nymph. There is little known information on the life cycle, but adults were collected in mid-summer. The short, robust legs, with their reduced spines and spurs, are well-adapted for an arenicolous, or burrow-dwelling existence.

References

Insects of the United States
Orthoptera of North America
Stenopelmatoidea
Taxonomy articles created by Polbot
Insects described in 1965